De Nijlânnermolen is a smock mill in Workum, Friesland, Netherlands. It has been restored to working order and is designated as a reserve mill. It is listed as a Rijksmonument.

History
De Nijlânnermolen was built in 1785. The first mill on this site was built in 1770. It had a sail span of 60 Dutch feet. The mill drove a scoopwheel. It soon became apparent that this mill was too small due to insufficient pumping capacity. Following a major inundation in 1776, a new mill was built by millwright Widmer Sipkes in 1784-85. The mill had originally been built in 1770 and was moved here, being erected on the base of the existing mill. It had a sail span of 76 Dutch feet.

De Nijlânnermolen was worked by wind until 1950, when a diesel engine was placed in De Nijlânnermolen and a new, larger, Archimedes' screw was installed. The mill was sold to the Waterschap Tusken Mar en Klif. In 1987, the mill was sold to the Workumer Molenstichting for ƒ1. The mill was restored in 1987-88 by Bouw '75 of Workum, at a cost of ƒ182,000. The restored mill was set to work again on 8 October 1988. A replacement Archimedes' screw was fitted in 2006. The mill is now owned by the Molenstichting Sûdwest Fryslân. Designated as being held i reserve, it is listed as a Rijksmonument, №39452.

Description

De Nijlânnermolen is what the Dutch describe as a Grondzeiler. It is a two storey smock mill on a single storey base. There is no stage, the sails reaching almost to ground level. The mill is winded by tailpole and winch. The smock and cap are thatched. The sails are Common sails. The sails are carried on a cast iron windshaft, which was cast by Gietijzerij L I Enthoven en Co., The Hague, South Holland. The windshaft carries the brake wheel which has 65 cogs. This drives the wallower (32 cogs) at  the top of the upright shaft. At the bottom of the upright shaft there are two crown wheels The upper crown wheel, which has 37 cogs drives an Archimedes' screw via a crown wheel. The lower crown wheel, which has 36 cogs is carried on the axle of an Archimedes' screw, which is used to drain the polder.

The screw was  diameter. It was inclined at 19°. Each revolution of the screw lifted  of water.

Public access
De Nijlânnermolen is open on Saturdays from 09:00 to 12:00, or by appointment.

References

Windmills in Friesland
Windmills completed in 1785
Smock mills in the Netherlands
Windpumps in the Netherlands
Agricultural buildings in the Netherlands
Rijksmonuments in Friesland
Octagonal buildings in the Netherlands